On 28 April 2022, seven people were killed after Islamic State gunmen stormed a house in Abu Khashab, Deir ez-Zor Governorate, Syria.

Attack
Islamic State gunmen on motorcycles stormed a house hosted by former Syrian Democratic Forces spokesman Nouri Hamish, during iftar being held to mark the end of a Ramadan fast. Many of his friends were attending the gathering.

Seven people were killed, including Nouri Hamish, while four more were injured. The attack ended after the perpetrators were confronted by locals, causing the gunmen to flee.

The Islamic State later claimed responsibility for the attack, saying it was part of an operation called "Vengeance for two Sheikhs" that was launched in retaliation for the assassinations of Abu Ibrahim al-Hashimi al-Qurashi and Abu Hamza al-Qurashi.

References 

2022 mass shootings in Asia
21st-century mass murder in Syria
2022 in the Syrian civil war
History of Deir ez-Zor Governorate
ISIL terrorist incidents in Syria
Islamic terrorist incidents in 2022
Mass murder in 2022
Terrorist incidents in Syria in 2022
April 2022 crimes in Asia